The modern Chinese varieties make frequent use of what are called classifiers or measure words. One use of classifiers is when a noun is qualified by a numeral known as a noun phrase. When a phrase such as "one person" or "three books" is translated into Chinese, it is normally necessary to insert an appropriate classifier between the numeral and the noun. For example, in Standard Mandarin, the first of these phrases would be  yí  rén, where yī means "one", rén means "person", and gè is the required classifier. There are also other grammatical contexts in which classifiers are used, including after the demonstratives 这 (這) zhè ("this") and 那 nà ("that"); however, when a noun stands alone without any such qualifier, no classifier is needed. There are also various other uses of classifiers: for example, when placed after a noun rather than before it, or when repeated, a classifier signifies a plural or indefinite quantity.

The terms "classifier" and "measure word" are frequently used interchangeably (as equivalent to the Chinese term  liàngcí, which literally means "measure word"). Sometimes, however, the two are distinguished, with classifier denoting a particle without any particular meaning of its own, as in the example above, and measure word denoting a word for a particular quantity or measurement of something, such as "drop", "cupful", or "liter". The latter type also includes certain words denoting lengths of time, units of currency, etc. These two types are alternatively called count-classifier and mass-classifier, since the first type can only meaningfully be used with count nouns, while the second is used particularly with mass nouns. However, the grammatical behavior of words of the two types is largely identical.

Most nouns have one or more particular classifiers associated with them, often depending on the nature of the things they denote. For example, many nouns denoting flat objects such as tables, papers, beds, and benches use the classifier  () zhāng, whereas many long and thin objects use  () tiáo. The total number of classifiers in Chinese may be put at anywhere from a few dozen to several hundred, depending on how they are counted. Mass-classifiers might be used with all sorts of nouns with which they make sense: for example,  hé ("box") may be used to denote boxes of objects, such as lightbulbs or books, even though those nouns would be used with their own appropriate count-classifiers if being counted as individual objects. Researchers have differing views as to how classifier–noun pairings arise: some regard them as being based on innate semantic features of the noun (for example, all nouns denoting "long" objects take a certain classifier because of their inherent longness), while others see them as motivated more by analogy to prototypical pairings (for example, "dictionary" comes to take the same classifier as the more common word "book"). There is some variation in the pairings used, with speakers of different dialects often using different classifiers for the same item. Some linguists have proposed that the use of classifier phrases may be guided less by grammar and more by stylistic or pragmatic concerns on the part of a speaker who may be trying to foreground new or important information.

Many other languages of the Mainland Southeast Asia linguistic area exhibit similar classifier systems, leading to speculation about the origins of the Chinese system. Ancient classifier-like constructions, which used a repeated noun rather than a special classifier, are attested in Old Chinese as early as 1400 BCE, but true classifiers did not appear in these phrases until much later. Originally, classifiers and numbers came after the noun rather than before, and probably moved before the noun sometime after 500 BCE. The use of classifiers did not become a mandatory part of Old Chinese grammar until around 1100 CE. Some nouns became associated with specific classifiers earlier than others; the earliest probably being nouns that signified culturally valued items such as horses and poems. Many words that are classifiers today started out as full nouns; in some cases their meanings have been gradually bleached away so that they are now used only as classifiers.

Usage

In Chinese, a numeral cannot usually quantify a noun by itself; instead, the language relies on classifiers, commonly also referred to as measure words. When a noun is preceded by a number, a demonstrative such as this or that, or certain quantifiers such as every, a classifier must normally be inserted before the noun. Thus, while English speakers say "one person" or "this person", Mandarin Chinese speakers say  (yí  rén, one- person) or  (zhè  rén, this- person), respectively. If a noun is preceded by both a demonstrative and a number, the demonstrative comes first. (This is just as in English, e.g. "these three cats".) If an adjective modifies the noun, it typically comes after the classifier and before the noun. The general structure of a classifier phrase is
 –  –  –  – 

The tables below give examples of common types of classifier phrases. While most English nouns do not require classifiers or measure words (in English, both “five dogs” and “five cups of coffee” are grammatically correct), nearly all Chinese nouns do; thus, in the first table, phrases that have no classifier in English have one in Chinese.

On the other hand, when a noun is not counted or introduced with a demonstrative, a classifier is not necessary: for example, there is a classifier in  (sān liàng chē, three- car, "three cars") but not in  (wǒ-de chē, me-possessive car, "my car"). Furthermore, numbers and demonstratives are often not required in Chinese, so speakers may choose not to use one—and thus not to use a classifier. For example, to say "Zhangsan turned into a tree", both  (Zhāngsān biànchéng -le yì  shù, Zhangsan become PAST one  tree) and  (Zhāngsān biànchéng -le shù, Zhangsan become PAST tree) are acceptable. The use of classifiers after demonstratives is in fact optional.

It is also possible for a classifier alone to qualify a noun, the numeral ("one") being omitted, as in 买马 mǎi  mǎ "buy  horse", i.e. "buy a horse".

Specialized uses

In addition to their uses with numbers and demonstratives, classifiers have some other functions. A classifier placed after a noun expresses a plural or indefinite quantity of it. For example,  (shū-, book-) means "the books" (e.g. on a shelf, or in a library), whereas the standard pre-nominal construction  (yī  shū, one- book) means "one book".

Many classifiers may be reduplicated to mean "every". For example,  (- rén, - person) signifies "every person".

Finally, a classifier used along with 一 (yī, "one") and after a noun conveys a meaning close to "all of" or "the entire" or "a ___full of". The sentence  (tiānkōng yī  yún, sky one- cloud), meaning "the sky was full of clouds", uses the classifier  (piàn, slice), which refers to the sky, not the clouds.

Types
The vast majority of classifiers are those that count or classify nouns (nominal classifiers, as in all the examples given so far, as opposed to verbal classifiers). These are further subdivided into count-classifiers and mass-classifiers, described below. In everyday speech, people often use the term "measure word", or its literal Chinese equivalent  liàngcí, to cover all Chinese count-classifiers and mass-classifiers, but the types of words grouped under this term are not all the same. Specifically, the various types of classifiers exhibit numerous differences in meaning, in the kinds of words they attach to, and in syntactic behavior.

Chinese has a large number of nominal classifiers; estimates of the number in Mandarin range from "several dozen" or "about 50", to over 900. The range is so large because some of these estimates include all types of classifiers while others include only count-classifiers, and because the idea of what constitutes a "classifier" has changed over time. Today, regular dictionaries include 120 to 150 classifiers; the 8822-word Syllabus of Graded Words and Characters for Chinese Proficiency lists 81; and a 2009 list compiled by Gao Ming and Barbara Malt includes 126. The number of classifiers that are in everyday, informal use, however, may be lower: linguist Mary Erbaugh has claimed that about two dozen "core classifiers" account for most classifier use. As a whole, though, the classifier system is so complex that specialized classifier dictionaries have been published.

Count-classifiers and mass-classifiers

Within the set of nominal classifiers, linguists generally draw a distinction between "count-classifiers" and "mass-classifiers". True count-classifiers are used for naming or counting a single count noun, and have no direct translation in English; for example,  (yì  shū, one- book) can only be translated in English as "one book" or "a book".  Furthermore, count-classifiers cannot be used with mass nouns: just as an English speaker cannot ordinarily say *"five muds", a Chinese speaker cannot say * (wǔ  nì, five- mud). For such mass nouns, one must use mass-classifiers.

Mass-classifiers (true measure words) do not pick out inherent properties of an individual noun like count-classifiers do; rather, they lump nouns into countable units. Thus, mass-classifiers can generally be used with multiple types of nouns; for example, while the mass-classifier  (hé, box) can be used to count boxes of lightbulbs ( yì  dēngpào, "one  of lightbulbs") or of books ( yì  jiàocái, "one  of textbooks"), each of these nouns must use a different count-classifier when being counted by itself ( yì  dēngpào "one lightbulb"; vs.  yì  jiàocái "one textbook"). While count-classifiers have no direct English translation, mass-classifiers often do: phrases with count-classifiers such as  (yí  rén, one- person) can only be translated as "one person" or "a person", whereas those with mass-classifiers such as  (yì  rén, one--person) can be translated as "a crowd of people". All languages, including English, have mass-classifiers, but count-classifiers are unique to certain "classifier languages", and are not a part of English grammar apart from a few exceptional cases such as head of livestock.

Within the range of mass-classifiers, authors have proposed subdivisions based on the manner in which a mass-classifier organizes the noun into countable units. One of these is measurement units (also called "standard measures"), which all languages must have in order to measure items; this category includes units such as kilometers, liters, or pounds (see list). Like other classifiers, these can also stand without a noun; thus, for example,  (bàng, pound) may appear as both  (sān  ròu, "three  of meat") or just  (sān , "three ", never * sān  ). Units of currency behave similarly: for example, 十 (shí , "ten "), which is short for (for example) 十人民币 (shí  rénmínbì, "ten  of renminbi").

The difference between count-classifiers and mass-classifiers can be described as one of quantifying versus categorizing: in other words, mass-classifiers create a unit by which to measure something (i.e. boxes, groups, chunks, pieces, etc.), whereas count-classifiers simply name an existing item. In addition to these semantic differences, there are differences in the grammatical behaviors of count-classifiers and mass-classifiers; for example, mass-classifiers may be modified by a small set of adjectives (as in  yí dà  rén, "a big  of people"), whereas count-classifiers usually may not (for example, * yí dà  rén is never said for "a big person"; instead the adjective must modify the noun:  yí  dà rén). Another difference is that count-classifiers may often be replaced by a "general" classifier , gè with no apparent change in meaning, whereas mass-classifiers may not. Syntacticians Lisa Cheng and Rint Sybesma propose that count-classifiers and mass-classifiers have different underlying syntactic structures, with count-classifiers forming "classifier phrases", and mass-classifiers being a sort of relative clause that only looks like a classifier phrase. The distinction between count-classifiers and mass-classifiers is often unclear, however, and other linguists have suggested that count-classifiers and mass-classifiers may not be fundamentally different. They posit that "count-classifier" and "mass-classifier" are the extremes of a continuum, with most classifiers falling somewhere in between.

Verbal classifiers

There is a set of "verbal classifiers" used specifically for counting the number of times an action occurs, rather than counting a number of items; this set includes  cì, / biàn,  huí, and  xià, which all roughly translate to "times". For example,  (wǒ qù-guo sān  Běijīng, I go-PAST three- Beijing, "I have been to Beijing three "). These words can also form compound classifiers with certain nouns, as in  rén cì "person-time", which can be used to count (for example) visitors to a museum in a year (where visits by the same person on different occasions are counted separately).

Another type of verbal classifier indicates the tool or implement used to perform the action. An example is found in the sentence  tā tī le wǒ yī jiǎo "he kicked me", or more literally "he kicked me one foot". The word  jiǎo, which usually serves as a simple noun meaning "foot", here functions as a verbal classifier reflecting the tool (namely the foot) used to perform the kicking action.

Relation to nouns

Different classifiers often correspond to different particular nouns.  For example, books generally take the classifier  běn, flat objects take  () zhāng, animals take  () zhī, machines take  tái, large buildings and mountains take  zuò, etc. Within these categories are further subdivisions—while most animals take  () zhī, domestic animals take  () tóu, long and flexible animals take  () tiáo, and horses take  pǐ. Likewise, while long things that are flexible (such as ropes) often take  () tiáo, long things that are rigid (such as sticks) take  gēn, unless they are also round (like pens or cigarettes), in which case in some dialects they take  zhī. Classifiers also vary in how specific they are; some (such as  duǒ for flowers and  other similarly clustered items) are generally only used with one type, whereas others (such as  () tiáo for long and flexible things, one-dimensional things, or abstract items like news reports) are much less restricted. Furthermore, there is not a one-to-one relationship between nouns and classifiers: the same noun may be paired with different classifiers in different situations. The specific factors that govern which classifiers are paired with which nouns have been a subject of debate among linguists.

Categories and prototypes
While mass-classifiers do not necessarily bear any semantic relationship to the noun with which they are used (e.g. box and book are not related in meaning, but one can still say "a box of books"), count-classifiers do. The precise nature of that relationship, however, is not certain, since there is so much variability in how objects may be organized and categorized by classifiers. Accounts of the semantic relationship may be grouped loosely into categorical theories, which propose that count-classifiers are matched to objects solely on the basis of inherent features of those objects (such as length or size), and prototypical theories, which propose that people learn to match a count-classifier to a specific prototypical object and to other objects that are like that prototype.

The categorical, "classical" view of classifiers was that each classifier represents a category with a set of conditions; for example, the classifier  () tiáo would represent a category defined as all objects that meet the conditions of being long, thin, and one-dimensional—and nouns using that classifier must fit all the conditions with which the category is associated.  Some common semantic categories into which count-classifiers have been claimed to organize nouns include the categories of shape (long, flat, or round), size (large or small), consistency (soft or hard), animacy (human, animal, or object), and function (tools, vehicles, machines, etc.).

On the other hand, proponents of prototype theory propose that count-classifiers may not have innate definitions, but are associated with a noun that is prototypical of that category, and nouns that have a "family resemblance" with the prototype noun will want to use the same classifier.  For example, horse in Chinese uses the classifier  pǐ, as in  (sān  mǎ, "three horses")—in modern Chinese the word  has no meaning. Nevertheless, nouns denoting animals that look like horses will often also use this same classifier, and native speakers have been found to be more likely to use the classifier  the closer an animal looks to a horse. Furthermore, words that do not meet the "criteria" of a semantic category may still use that category because of their association with a prototype. For example, the classifier  () kē is used for small round items, as in  (yì  zǐdàn, "one bullet"); when words like  (yuánzǐdàn, "atomic bomb") were later introduced into the language they also used this classifier, even though they are not small and round—therefore, their classifier must have been assigned because of the words' association with the word for bullet, which acted as a "prototype". This is an example of "generalization" from prototypes: Erbaugh has proposed that when children learn count-classifiers, they go through stages, first learning a classifier-noun pair only (such as   yú, -fish), then using that classifier with multiple nouns that are similar to the prototype (such as other types of fish), then finally using that set of nouns to generalize a semantic feature associated with the classifier (such as length and flexibility) so that the classifier can then be used with new words that the person encounters.

Some classifier-noun pairings are arbitrary, or at least appear to modern speakers to have no semantic motivation. For instance, the classifier  bù may be used for movies and novels, but also for cars and telephones. Some of this arbitrariness may be due to what linguist James Tai refers to as "fossilization", whereby a count-classifier loses its meaning through historical changes but remains paired with some nouns. For example, the classifier  pǐ used for horses is meaningless today, but in Classical Chinese may have referred to a "team of two horses", a pair of horse skeletons, or the pairing between man and horse. Arbitrariness may also arise when a classifier is borrowed, along with its noun, from a dialect in which it has a clear meaning to one in which it does not. In both these cases, the use of the classifier is remembered more by association with certain "prototypical" nouns (such as horse) rather than by understanding of semantic categories, and thus arbitrariness has been used as an argument in favor of the prototype theory of classifiers. Gao and Malt propose that both the category and prototype theories are correct: in their conception, some classifiers constitute "well-defined categories", others make "prototype categories", and still others are relatively arbitrary.

Neutralization
In addition to the numerous "specific" count-classifiers described above, Chinese has a "general" classifier , pronounced gè in Mandarin. This classifier is used for people, some abstract concepts, and other words that do not have special classifiers (such as 汉堡包 hànbǎobāo "hamburger"), and may also be used as a replacement for a specific classifier such as  () zhāng or  () tiáo, especially in informal speech. Numerous studies have reported that both adults and children tend to use  when they do not know the appropriate count-classifier, and even when they do but are speaking quickly or informally. The replacement of a specific classifier with the general  is known as classifier neutralization ("" in Chinese, literally "classifier 个-ization"). This occurs especially often among children and aphasics (individuals with damage to language-relevant areas of the brain), although normal speakers also neutralize frequently. It has been reported that most speakers know the appropriate classifiers for the words they are using and believe, when asked, that those classifiers are obligatory, but nevertheless use  without even realizing it in actual speech. As a result, in everyday spoken Mandarin the general classifier is "hundreds of times more frequent" than the specialized ones.

Nevertheless,  has not completely replaced other count-classifiers, and there are still many situations in which it would be inappropriate to substitute it for the required specific classifier. There may be specific patterns behind which classifier-noun pairs may be "neutralized" to use the general classifier, and which may not. Specifically, words that are most prototypical for their categories, such as paper for the category of nouns taking the "flat/square" classifier  () zhāng, may be less likely to be said with a general classifier.

Variation in usage

It is not the case that every noun is only associated with one classifier. Across dialects and speakers there is great variability in the way classifiers are used for the same words, and speakers often do not agree which classifier is best. For example, for cars some people use  bù, others use  tái, and still others use  () liàng; Cantonese uses  gaa3. Even within a single dialect or a single speaker, the same noun may take different measure words depending on the style in which the person is speaking, or on different nuances the person wants to convey (for instance, measure words can reflect the speaker's judgment of or opinion about the object).

Finally, a single word may have multiple count-classifiers that convey different meanings altogether—in fact, the choice of a classifier can even influence the meaning of a noun. By way of illustration,  sān  kè means "three class periods" (as in "I have three classes today"), whereas  sān  kè means "three courses" (as in "I signed up for three courses this semester"), even though the noun in each sentence is the same.

Purpose
In research on classifier systems, and Chinese classifiers in particular, it has been asked why count-classifiers (as opposed to mass-classifiers) exist at all. Mass-classifiers are present in all languages since they are the only way to "count" mass nouns that are not naturally divided into units (as, for example, "three  of mud" in English; *"three muds" is ungrammatical). On the other hand, count-classifiers are not inherently mandatory, and are absent from most languages. Furthermore, count-classifiers are used with an "unexpectedly low frequency"; in many settings, speakers avoid specific classifiers by just using a bare noun (without a number or demonstrative) or using the general classifier  gè. Linguists and typologists such as Joseph Greenberg have suggested that specific count-classifiers are semantically "redundant", repeating information present within the noun. Count-classifiers can be used stylistically, though, and can also be used to clarify or limit a speaker's intended meaning when using a vague or ambiguous noun; for example, the noun  kè "class" can refer to courses in a semester or specific class periods during a day, depending on whether the classifier  () mén or  () jié is used.

One proposed explanation for the existence of count-classifiers is that they serve more of a cognitive purpose than a practical one: in other words, they provide a linguistic way for speakers to organize or categorize real objects. An alternative account is that they serve more of a discursive and pragmatic function (a communicative function when people interact) rather than an abstract function within the mind. Specifically, it has been proposed that count-classifiers might be used to mark new or unfamiliar objects within a discourse, to introduce major characters or items in a story or conversation, or to foreground important information and objects by making them bigger and more salient. In this way, count-classifiers might not serve an abstract grammatical or cognitive function, but may help in communication by making important information more noticeable and drawing attention to it.

History

Classifier phrases

Historical linguists have found that phrases consisting of nouns and numbers went through several structural changes in Old Chinese and Middle Chinese before classifiers appeared in them. The earliest forms may have been Number – Noun, like English (i.e. "five horses"), and the less common Noun – Number ("horses five"), both of which are attested in the oracle bone scripts of Pre-Archaic Chinese (circa 1400 BCE to 1000 BCE). The first constructions resembling classifier constructions were Noun – Number – Noun constructions, which were also extant in Pre-Archaic Chinese but less common than Number – Noun. In these constructions, sometimes the first and second nouns were identical (N1 – Number – N1, as in "horses five horses") and other times the second noun was different, but semantically related (N1 – Number – N2). According to some historical linguists, the N2 in these constructions can be considered an early form of count-classifier and has even been called an "echo classifier"; this speculation is not universally agreed on, though. Although true count-classifiers had not appeared yet, mass-classifiers were common in this time, with constructions such as "wine – six – " (the word  yǒu represented a wine container) meaning "six yǒu of wine". Examples such as this suggest that mass-classifiers predate count-classifiers by several centuries, although they did not appear in the same word order as they do today.

It is from this type of structure that count-classifiers may have arisen, originally replacing the second noun (in structures where there was a noun rather than a mass-classifier) to yield Noun – Number – Classifier. That is to say, constructions like "horses five horses" may have been replaced by ones like "horses five ", possibly for stylistic reasons such as avoiding repetition. Another reason for the appearance of count-classifiers may have been to avoid confusion or ambiguity that could have arisen from counting items using only mass-classifiers—i.e. to clarify when one is referring to a single item and when one is referring to a measure of items.

Historians agree that at some point in history the order of words in this construction shifted, putting the noun at the end rather than beginning, like in the present-day construction Number – Classifier – Noun. According to historical linguist Alain Peyraube, the earliest occurrences of this construction (albeit with mass-classifiers, rather than count-classifiers) appear in the late portion of Old Chinese (500 BCE to 200 BCE). At this time, the Number – Mass-classifier portion of the Noun – Number – Mass-classifier construction was sometimes shifted in front of the noun. Peyraube speculates that this may have occurred because it was gradually reanalyzed as a modifier (like an adjective) for the head noun, as opposed to a simple repetition as it originally was. Since Chinese generally places modifiers before modified, as does English,  the shift may have been prompted by this reanalysis. By the early part of the Common Era, the nouns appearing in "classifier position" were beginning to lose their meaning and become true classifiers. Estimates of when classifiers underwent the most development vary: Wang Li claims their period of major development was during the Han Dynasty (206 BCE – 220 CE), whereas Liu Shiru estimates that it was the Southern and Northern Dynasties period (420 – 589 CE), and Peyraube chooses the Tang Dynasty (618 – 907 CE). Regardless of when they developed, Wang Lianqing claims that they did not become grammatically mandatory until sometime around the 11th century.

Classifier systems in many nearby languages and language groups (such as Vietnamese and  the Tai languages) are very similar to the Chinese classifier system in both grammatical structure and the parameters along which some objects are grouped together. Thus, there has been some debate over which language family first developed classifiers and which ones then borrowed them—or whether classifier systems were native to all these languages and developed more through repeated language contact throughout history.

Classifier words
Most modern count-classifiers are derived from words that originally were free-standing nouns in older varieties of Chinese, and have since been grammaticalized to become bound morphemes. In other words, count-classifiers tend to come from words that once had specific meaning but lost it (a process known as semantic bleaching). Many, however, still have related forms that work as nouns all by themselves, such as the classifier  () dài for long, ribbon-like objects: the modern word  dàizi means "ribbon". In fact, the majority of classifiers can also be used as other parts of speech, such as nouns. Mass-classifiers, on the other hand, are more transparent in meaning than count-classifiers; while the latter have some historical meaning, the former are still full-fledged nouns.

It was not always the case that every noun required a count-classifier. In many historical varieties of Chinese, use of classifiers was not mandatory, and classifiers are rare in writings that have survived. Some nouns acquired classifiers earlier than others; some of the first documented uses of classifiers were for inventorying items, both in mercantile business and in storytelling. Thus, the first nouns to have count-classifiers paired with them may have been nouns that represent "culturally valued" items such as horses, scrolls, and intellectuals. The special status of such items is still apparent today: many of the classifiers that can only be paired with one or two nouns, such as  pǐ for horses and  shǒu for songs or poems, are the classifiers for these same "valued" items. Such classifiers make up as much as one-third of the commonly used classifiers today.

Classifiers did not gain official recognition as a lexical category (part of speech) until the 20th century. The earliest modern text to discuss classifiers and their use was Ma Jianzhong's 1898 Ma's Basic Principles for Writing Clearly. From then until the 1940s, linguists such as Ma, Wang Li, and Li Jinxi treated classifiers as just a type of noun that "expresses a quantity". Lü Shuxiang was the first to treat them as a separate category, calling them "unit words" ( dānwèicí) in his 1940s Outline of Chinese Grammar and finally "measure words" ( liàngcí) in Grammar Studies. He made this separation based on the fact that classifiers were semantically bleached, and that they can be used directly with a number, whereas true nouns need to have a measure word added before they can be used with a number. After this time, other names were also proposed for classifiers: Gao Mingkai called them "noun helper words" ( zhùmíngcí), Lu Wangdao "counting markers" ( jìbiāo), and Japanese linguist Miyawaki Kennosuke called them "accompanying words" ( péibàncí). In the  adopted by the People's Republic of China in 1954, Lü's "measure words" ( liàngcí) was adopted as the official name for classifiers in China. This remains the most common term in use today.

General classifiers
Historically,  gè was not always the general classifier. Some believe it was originally a noun referring to bamboo stalks, and gradually expanded in use to become a classifier for many things with "vertical, individual, [or] upright qualit[ies]", eventually becoming a general classifier because it was used so frequently with common nouns. Historical linguist Lianqing Wang has argued that these characters actually originated from different words, and that only  had the original meaning of "bamboo stalk". , he claims, was used as a general classifier early on, and may have been derived from the orthographically similar  jiè, one of the earliest general classifiers.  later merged with  because they were similar in pronunciation and meaning (both used as general classifiers).

Nor was  the only general classifier in the history of Chinese. The aforementioned  jiè was being used as a general classifier before the Qin Dynasty (221 BCE); it was originally a noun referring to individual items out of a string of connected shells or clothes, and eventually came to be used as a classifier for "individual" objects (as opposed to pairs or groups of objects) before becoming a general classifier. Another general classifier was  méi, which originally referred to small twigs. Since twigs were used for counting items,  became a counter word: any items, including people, could be counted as "one , two ", etc.  was the most common classifier in use during the Southern and Northern Dynasties period (420–589 CE), but today is no longer a general classifier, and is only used rarely, as a specialized classifier for items such as pins and badges. Kathleen Ahrens has claimed that  (zhī in Mandarin and jia in Taiwanese), the classifier for animals in Mandarin, is another general classifier in Taiwanese and may be becoming one in the Mandarin spoken in Taiwan.

Variety
Northern dialects tend to have fewer classifiers than southern ones. 個 ge is the only classifier found in the Dungan language. All nouns could have just one classifier in some dialects, such as Shanghainese (Wu), the Mandarin dialect of Shanxi, and Shandong dialects. Some dialects such as Northern Min, certain Xiang dialects, Hakka dialects, and some Yue dialects use 隻 for the noun referring to people, rather than 個.

See also

List of Chinese classifiers
Chinese grammar
Collective noun
Classifiers in other languages:
Burmese numerical classifiers
Hokkien counter word
Japanese counter word
Korean counter word
Vietnamese classifier

Notes

References

Bibliography

External links
List of Common Nominal Measure Words on chinesenotes.com
Units of Weights and Measures on chinesenotes.com
How to Use Chinese Measure Words on 3000 Hanzi

Classifier
Parts of speech

ja:助数詞#中国語の助数詞